Anton Vasilyevich Vlasov (born 11 May 1989) is a Russian former football defender.

Club career
He made his Russian Football National League debut for FC Anzhi Makhachkala on 28 August 2009 in a game against FC Krasnodar. He played one more season in the FNL for FC Volga Nizhny Novgorod.

International career
Vlasov was one of the members of the Russian U-17 squad that won the 2006 UEFA U-17 Championship. He is a part of the Russia U-21 side that is competing in the 2011 European Under-21 Championship qualification.

References

External links
 
 

1989 births
People from Ust-Labinsky District
Living people
Russian footballers
Association football defenders
Russia youth international footballers
Russia under-21 international footballers
PFC CSKA Moscow players
FC Anzhi Makhachkala players
FC Volga Nizhny Novgorod players
FC Khimik Dzerzhinsk players
FC Orenburg players
FC Taganrog players
FC SKA Rostov-on-Don players
Sportspeople from Krasnodar Krai